Federico Nicolás Recalde (born 11 August 1996) is an Argentine professional footballer who plays as a midfielder for Villa Dálmine.

Career
Recalde's career began with Villa Dálmine. He was initially an unused substitute in the Copa Argentina against Tristán Suárez on 7 February 2015, with his professional debut arriving a month later in a Primera B Nacional defeat to Atlético Tucumán; a further appearance in 2015 arrived in October versus Unión Mar del Plata. His first senior goal came in his penultimate match of 2016, netting in a four-goal win away to Douglas Haig on 12 June 2016. In total, Recalde featured fifty-seven times and scored once in his opening four campaigns.

Career statistics
.

References

External links

1996 births
Living people
People from Campana, Buenos Aires
Argentine footballers
Association football midfielders
Primera Nacional players
Villa Dálmine footballers
Sportspeople from Buenos Aires Province